James Martin  is the chair of Scottish Legal Complaints Commission. He was Scotland's first independent police complaints commissioner 2007–2009 and was Scottish Public Services Ombudsman 2009–2017.

Early life
Martin was born in Larbert, Scotland. He worked as an economics and modern studies teacher at Falkirk High School.

He was the chair of Educational Institute of Scotland from 1987 until 1995, then worked for the life assurance society Scottish Amicable.

Ombudsman
In 2007, Martin was appointed as Scotland's first independent police complaints commissioner.

In March 2009, Parliament approved his appointment as Scottish Public Services Ombudsman.

He was appointed chair of the Scottish Legal Complaints Commission from 1 January 2018 to 31 January 2022.

Honours
He was appointed Commander of the Most Excellent Order of the British Empire (CBE) in the 2018 New Year Honours.

References

Ombudsmen in Scotland
Scottish civil servants
Living people
Year of birth missing (living people)
People from Larbert
Scottish schoolteachers
Commanders of the Order of the British Empire